Schnucks is a supermarket chain. Based in the St. Louis area, the company was founded in 1939 with the opening of a  store in north St. Louis and currently operates over 100 stores in four states throughout the Midwest (Missouri, Illinois, Indiana, and Wisconsin). Schnucks also ran stores under the Logli Supermarkets and Hilander Foods banners. Schnucks is one of the largest privately-held supermarket chains in the United States and dominates the St. Louis metro grocery market.

History

Schnuck Markets, Inc. was founded in St. Louis in 1939. By 1952, its first major store was opened in Brentwood, a St. Louis suburb. The Schnucks symbol, a soldier, was introduced in 1968 (during the Vietnam War). Schnucks continued to grow, adopting the motto "Friendliest Stores In Town" and acquiring stores in Illinois, Indiana, Tennessee, Mississippi, Missouri, Iowa, and Wisconsin. By the late 1960s, Schnucks had 10 stores in the St. Louis area.

In a merger in 1970, Schnucks acquired the Bettendorf-Rapp chain of grocery stores—temporarily forming the Schnucks-Bettendorf's chain until the latter half of the combined name was dropped a couple of years later—just as Bettendorf's had swallowed up the Rapp chain of stores to form Bettendorf-Rapp's in the 1960s. Schnucks underwent a major expansion in 1995 when it purchased from Loblaws the National Supermarkets chain (a total of 57 stores), also based in St. Louis.

The company's growth in the St. Louis area was bolstered by the local abandonment of two major supermarket chains: A&P in the 1970s, and Kroger in 1986.

Expansion 
In 2002, Schnucks agreed to buy 12 Seessel's stores in the Memphis, Tennessee area, from Albertsons, Inc. Schnucks operated these stores until September 2011. Kroger subsequently purchased these stores; eight reopened as Kroger, with the others closing altogether. Seven convenience stores operating under the Schnucks name also were sold, to be converted to the Kroger-owned brand Kwik Shop.

In 2008, Schnucks acquired grocery store Hart Food and Drug in O'Fallon, IL making it the fifth Schnucks in St. Clair County.

In August 2009, Schnucks opened a store in downtown St. Louis. This store, located at the corner of Ninth and Olive Streets in the central business district, was called "Culinaria – A Schnucks Market" and was advertised as a "new urban prototype". The store includes  of shopping space, an additional  mezzanine with a wine department, tapas/wine bar, a full-service pharmacy, meat and seafood departments, florist, bakery, and a Kaldi's Coffee bar. The placement of the store reflects the downtown area's urban renewal of the 21st century, including Washington Avenue Loft District, St. Louis loft-style condominiums and apartments. In 2020, Schnucks opened another prototype store, named "EatWell - A Natural Food Store by Schnucks", located in a former Lucky's Market off Providence Road in Columbia, Missouri near the campus of the University of Missouri.

On September 18, 2018, it was announced that SuperValu would sell 19 of its Shop 'n Save locations to Schnucks.

In 2020/2021, Schnucks exited the Iowa/Quad Cities market with the closing of their Bettendorf, Iowa store and a pharmacy in Moline, Illinois (with the customers transferred to the stand-alone CVS as part of that acquisition).

In September 2022, Schnucks purchased the only two locations of Missouri-based grocer Fricks Market. In October 2022, the newly renovated Schnucks store of Union opened to the general public.

Pharmacy
The first Schnucks Pharmacy was opened in March 1970. As of 2012, there are 95 in-store pharmacies across Missouri, Illinois, Indiana, Wisconsin and Iowa. The quality of the healthcare provided by Schnucks Pharmacy was recognized as "Pharmacy Chain of the Year 2008" by Drug Topics magazine. Schnucks offers over 50 generic prescriptions that can be filled for $4 for a 30-day supply, or $10 for a 90-day supply.

Beginning in 2020, the pharmacy at Schnucks was taken over by CVS Pharmacy, making them the second in-store pharmacy to be converted to the CVS brand after Target had switched to them a few years prior. Along with the ownership change comes with the closure of 11 pharmacies, mainly near existing CVS locations, with customers being transferred to those respective stores.

See also
 Kroger, largest supermarket chain in the United States
 National Supermarkets, former St. Louis chain of supermarkets, based in Canada
 Dierbergs Markets, its main competitor in the St. Louis area

References

1939 establishments in Missouri
Companies based in St. Louis County, Missouri
American companies established in 1939
Retail companies established in 1939
Supermarkets of the United States